Cafiero may refer to:

Antonio Cafiero, Argentinian politician
Claudio Cafiero, Italian footballer
Carlo Cafiero (1846-1892), Italian anarchist
Federico Cafiero (1914-1980), Italian mathematician
John Cafiero, American musician and director
James Cafiero, American politician
Juan Pablo Cafiero, Argentine politician
Mario Cafiero, Argentine politician
Santiago Cafiero, Argentine politician